A co-driver is the navigator of a rally car in the sport of rallying, who sits in the front passenger seat. The co-driver's job is to navigate, commonly by reading off a set of pacenotes to the driver (what lies ahead, where to turn, the severity of the turn, and what obstacles to look out for). Some competitions require map interpretation. In stage rallying communication is often over a radio headset, due to the high level of noise in the car. The co-driver also tells the driver about any incidents or accidents that may have occurred further ahead in the stage. This role is particularly critical in high-end rally competitions such as WRC. Co-drivers are also often called on to perform maintenance on the car during road sections and special stages, such as changing a wheel.

Notable co-drivers

 Björn Cederberg
 Sergio Cresto
 Mike Doughty
 Daniel Elena
 Ola Fløene
 Fred Gallagher
 Isabelle Galmiche
 Christian Geistdörfer
 Ana Goñi
 Nicky Grist
 Seppo Harjanne
 Arne Hertz
 Julien Ingrassia
 Denis Jenkinson
 Jarmo Lehtinen
 Lee McKenzie
 Gino Macaluso
 Risto Mannisenmäki
 Tony Mason
 Phil Mills
 Luis Moya
 Michael Park
 Maurizio Perissinot
 Fabrizia Pons
 Timo Rautiainen
 Robert Reid
 Nathalie Richard
 David Richards
 Derek Ringer
 Tiziano Siviero
 Tina Thörner
 Jean Todt
 Martin Järveoja

See also
Riding mechanic

References

Rally racing
Motorsport terminology